Mert Sarıkuş (born 13 May 2001) is a Turkish professional footballer who plays as a winger.

Club career
On 2 October 2020, Sarıkuş signed his first professional contract with Denizlispor. Sarıkuş made his professional debut with Denizlispor in a 2-0 Süper Lig loss to Hatayspor on 17 January 2021.

References

External links
TFF Profile

1994 births
Sportspeople from Denizli
Living people
Turkish footballers
Association football wingers
Denizlispor footballers
Süper Lig players